Shamsher Singh Manhas (born 4 January 1960 in Jammu, India) is the Bharatiya Janata Party politician from the Jammu & Kashmir. He is the son of Janak Singh (not to be confused with Janak Singh). He is an agriculturist and political and social worker by profession. He is known as the rejuvenator of Right wing Political ideology in the UT of jammu and kashmir and has been an active Pracharak of RSS for a long time, He is known to be a powerful politician in the region.  He is also a sportsperson.

Shamsher Singh Manhas is a well known personality in the politics of the J&K.He has already served as State President of BJP in the past

He was elected to Rajya Sabha from state of Jammu and Kashmir on the ticket of BJP in February 2015.

He retired on 9 February 2021.

References

1960 births
Living people
People from Jammu
Rajya Sabha members from Jammu and Kashmir
Bharatiya Janata Party politicians from Jammu and Kashmir